Minnesota is a state in the United States.

Minnesota may also refer to:
Minnesota (band), a German Eurodance band
"Minnesota" (song), a song by Lil Yachty
Minnesota River, a tributary of the Mississippi River
University of Minnesota
Minnesota Golden Gophers, the athletic program of the University of Minnesota
Minnesota City, Minnesota, a city in Winona County
Minnesota Point, a cape in Duluth, Minnesota
SS Minnesota, an ocean liner

See also
Minnesota Junction, Wisconsin, an unincorporated community